Égyptienne or L'Égyptienne may refer to:

Music
 L'Égyptienne, a 1728 harpsichord composition by Rameau
 L'égyptienne (Lecocq), an 1890 operetta
 "L'Égyptienne" (song), a 1997 song by Belgian singer Natacha Atlas and French group Les Négresses Vertes

Other
 Égyptienne (ship), the name of various ships during the French Revolutionary and Napoleonic Wars
 Egyptienne (typeface), a slab serif typeface designed in 1956 by Adrian Frutiger for Deberny & Peignot
 L'Égyptienne (magazine), a French language women's magazine published in Egypt from 1925 to 1940

See also 
 Egyptian (disambiguation)